I'm Up is a mixtape by American rapper Gucci Mane. It was released on May 25, 2012, by 1017 Bricksquad. This mixtape includes guest appearances from Yo Gotti, Rocko, Future, Chris Brown, Lil Wayne, Big Sean, 8Ball,  Rick Ross, Birdman, Jim Jones, Fabolous, Scarface, T.I., Jeremih and 2 Chainz.

Reception

Critical response 

Ralph Bristout of XXL said "Despite the notable joints, I'm Up is flooded with featured guests, whom often outshine the rapper ("Don't Make No Sense" next to Fabolous and 8Ball; "Scarface" alongside Scarface). Though they don't necessarily hurt the project— adding a mélange of different styles and various temperaments—the supporting cast makes the tape seem more like a compilation project than a solo." Slava Kuperstein of HipHopDX said "Whatever criticisms fans may offer of Gucci Mane, the man works the mixtape scene hard. A cursory look at Wikipedia reveals that I'm Up is Gucci's 27th mixtape; not only that, but it's the second of this year. Sure, it's easier to have such prolific output when your subject matter is so narrow you could thread a needle with it, but Gucci delivers what the people want from him: a handful of hard-hitting beats, a few quotables, and some memorable guest spots."

Music videos
Music videos has been released for songs such as "Super Cocky", "Kansas" featuring Jim Jones, "Wish You Would" featuring Verse Simmonds, "Brought Out Them Racks" featuring Big Sean, "Plain Jane (Remix)" featuring Rocko and T.I., and "Too Sexy" featuring Jeremih.

Track listing

References

2012 mixtape albums
Gucci Mane albums
Albums produced by Drumma Boy
Albums produced by Zaytoven
Albums produced by Lex Luger
Albums produced by Polow da Don
Albums produced by Fatboi
Albums produced by Shawty Redd
Albums produced by Young Chop
Albums produced by Detail (record producer)
Albums produced by Sonny Digital